Tony Oxley (born 15 June 1938) is an English  free improvising drummer and one of the founders of Incus Records.

Biography
Oxley was born in Sheffield, England. A self-taught pianist by the age of eight, he first began playing the drums at seventeen. In Sheffield he was taught by Haydon Cook, who had returned to the city after a long residency in the 1950s at Ronnie Scott's in London. While in the Black Watch military band from 1957 to 1960, he studied music theory and improved his drumming technique. From 1960 to 1964 he led a quartet which performed locally in England. In 1963, he began working with Gavin Bryars and guitarist Derek Bailey, in a trio known as Joseph Holbrooke. Oxley moved to London in 1966 and became house drummer at Ronnie Scott's, where he accompanied visiting musicians such as Joe Henderson, Lee Konitz, Charlie Mariano, Stan Getz, Sonny Rollins, and Bill Evans until the early 1970s. He was a member of bands led by Gordon Beck, Alan Skidmore, and Mike Pyne.

In 1969, Oxley appeared on the John McLaughlin album Extrapolation and formed a quintet with Bailey, Jeff Clyne, Evan Parker, and Kenny Wheeler, releasing the album The Baptised Traveller. Following this album the group was joined by Paul Rutherford on trombone and became a sextet, releasing the 1970 album 4 Compositions for Sextet. That same year Oxley helped found Incus Records with Bailey and others and Musicians Cooperative. He received a three-month artist-in-residence job at the Sydney Conservatorium in Australia in 1970. Around this time he joined the London Jazz Composers Orchestra and collaborated with Howard Riley. In 1973 he became a tutor at the Jazz Summer School in Barry, South Wales, and in 1974 he formed the band Angular Apron. Through the 1980s he worked with Tony Coe and Didier Levallet and started the Celebration Orchestra during the latter half of the decade. In the late 1980s, Oxley toured and recorded with Anthony Braxton, and also began a working relationship with Cecil Taylor.

In 1993, he joined a quartet with Tomasz Stańko, Bobo Stenson, and Anders Jormin. In 2000 he released the album Triangular Screen with the Tony Oxley Project 1, a trio with Ivar Grydeland and Tonny Kluften.

Discography

As leader
 The Baptised Traveller (CBS, 1969)
 4 Compositions for Sextet (CBS, 1970)
 Ichnos (RCA Victor, 1971)
 Jazz in Britain '68-'69 with John Surman, Alan Skidmore (Decca Eclipse, 1972)
 Tony Oxley (Incus, 1975)
 The Alan Davie Music Workshop with Alan Davie (ADMW, 1975)
 February Papers (Incus, 1977)
 S.O.H. (EGO, 1979)
 Ach Was!? with Ulrich Gumpert, Radu Malfatti (FMP, 1981)
 SOH (View, 1981)
 Nutty On Willisau with Tony Coe (hatART, 1984)
 Live at Roccella Jonica with Norma Winstone, Kenny Wheeler, Paolo Fresu, John Taylor, Paolo Damiani (Ismez/Polis Music, 1985)
 Tomorrow Is Here Jazzfest Berlin 1985, Live from the Philharmonie (Dossier, 1986)
 The Glider & The Grinder with Philipp Wachsmann (Bead, 1987)
 Live in Roccella Jonica 1986 with Palle Mikkelborg, Charlie Mariano, Paolo Damiani, Tiziana Ghiglioni (Ismez/Polis, 1987)
 Bodies with Claudio Fasoli, Mick Goodrick, Palle Danielsson (New Sound Planet, 1990)
 Explore with Stefano Battaglia (Splasc(h), 1990)
 In the Evenings Out There with Paul Bley, Gary Peacock, John Surman (ECM, 1993)
 The Tony Oxley Quartet (Incus, 1993)
 Sulphur with Stefano Battaglia, Paolino Dalla Porta (Splasc(h), 1995)
 The Enchanted Messenger (Soul Note, 1995)
 Deep with Ekkehard Jost, Reiner Winterschladen, Ewald Oberleitner (Fish Music, 1997)
 Soho Suites (Recordings from 1977 & 1995) with Derek Bailey (Incus, 1997)
 Digger's Harvest with Alexander von Schlippenbach (FMP, 1999)
 Triangular Screen (Sofa, 2000)
 Floating Phantoms (a/l/l, 2002)
 GratHovOx with Frank Gratkowski, Fred Van Hove (Nuscope, 2002)
 S.O.H. Live in London with Alan Skidmore, Ali Haurand (Jazzwerkstatt 2007)
 The Advocate with Derek Bailey (Tzadik, 2007)
 Tony Oxley/Derek Bailey Quartet (Jazzwerkstatt, 2008)
 Live at Jazzwerkstatt Peitz with Conny Bauer, Gianluigi Trovesi, Dietmar Diesner (Jazzwerkstatt 2008)
 Improvised Pieces for Trio with Sebastiano Meloni, Adriano Orru (Big Round, 2010)
 A Birthday Tribute – 75 Years (Incus, 2013)
 Beaming (Confront Recordings, 2020)

With The Quartet
 Dedications (Konnex, 1984)
 Relation (Konnex, 1985)
 Interchange (Konnex, 1986)
 Live (Konnex, 1987)

As guest
With Gordon Beck
 Experiments with Pops (Major Minor, 1968)
 Gyroscope (Morgan, 1969)
 Seven Steps to Evans - A Tribute to the Compositions of Bill Evans (MPS, 1980)
 When Sunny Gets Blue (Spring '68 Sessions) (Turtle, 2018)

With Bill Dixon
 Vade Mecum (Soul Note, 1994)
 Vade Mecum II (Soul Note, 1994)
 Papyrus Volume I (Soul Note, 1999)
 Papyrus Volume II (Soul Note, 1999)
 Berlin Abbozzi (FMP, 2000)

With Barry Guy/London Jazz Composers Orchestra
 Ode (Incus, 1972)
 Stringer (FMP, 1983)
 Zurich Concerts (Intakt, 1988)

With Joseph Holbrooke
 ' 98 (Incus 2000)
 The Moat Recordings (Tzadik, 2006)

With Rolf Kühn
 Devil in Paradise (BASF, 1971)
 Going to the Rainbow (BASF, 1971)

With Howard Riley
 Flight (Turtle, 1971)
 Synopsis (Incus 1974)
 Overground (Emanem, 2001)

With Tomasz Stańko
 Matka Joanna (ECM, 1995)
 Leosia (ECM, 1997)

With John Surman
 How Many Clouds Can You See? (Deram, 1970)
 Adventure Playground (ECM, 1992)

With Cecil Taylor
 Leaf Palm Hand (Disc 6 of 11-disc set Cecil Taylor in Berlin '88) (FMP, 1989)
 Looking (Berlin Version) The Feel Trio (FMP, 1990)
 Looking (Berlin Version) Corona (FMP, 1991)
 Celebrated Blazons (FMP, 1993)
 Melancholy (FMP, 1999)
 Nailed (FMP, 2000)
 2 Ts for a Lovely T (Codanza, 2002)
 Taylor/Dixon/Oxley (Les Disques Victo, 2002)
 Ailanthus/Altissima: Bilateral Dimensions of 2 Root Songs (Triple Point, 2009)
 Conversations with Tony Oxley (Jazzwerkstatt, 2018)
 Birdland, Neuburg 2011 (Fundacja Słuchaj!, 2020)
 Being Astral and All Registers – Power of Two (Discus, 2020)

With others
 Paul Bley, Chaos with Furio Di Castri (Soul Note, 1998) 
 Anthony Braxton, Seven Compositions (Trio) 1989 (hatART, 1989)
 Peter Brötzmann, Berlin Djungle (FMP, 1987)
 Bill Evans, The 1972 Ljubljana Concert (2018)
 Georgie Fame, The Two Faces Of Fame (CBS, 1967)
 Michael Gibbs, Michael Gibbs (Deram, 1970)
 George Gruntz, Monster Sticksland Meeting Two: Monster Jazz (MPS, 1974)
 Tubby Hayes, Seven Steps to Heaven: Live at the Hopbine 1972 (Gearbox, 2013)
 Giorgio Gaslini & Jean-Luc Ponty, Jean-Luc Ponty Meets Giorgio Gaslini (1974)
 Don "Sugarcane" Harris, Keep On Driving (MPS, 1970)
 Didier Levallet, Scoop (In+Out, 1983)
 John McLaughlin, Extrapolation (1969)
 Mark Nauseef, All In All In All (Relative Pitch, 2018)
 Paul Rutherford & Iskra 1912, Sequences 72 & 73 (Emanem, 1997)
 Ronnie Scott, Live at Ronnie Scott's (CBS, 1968)
 Alan Skidmore, Once Upon a Time (Deram, 1970)
 Vangelis, Hypothesis (Bellaphon, 1978)
 Jasper van 't Hof and George Gruntz,  Fairytale (MPS 1979)
 Kenny Wheeler, Song for Someone (Incus, 1973)

Notes

References

1938 births
Living people
Musicians from Sheffield
British male drummers
English jazz drummers
Free jazz drummers
Avant-garde jazz musicians
Free improvisation
Tzadik Records artists
British male jazz musicians
Joseph Holbrooke (band) members
Incus Records artists
FMP/Free Music Production artists